Dilşat Yıldız (born September 29, 1996) is a Turkish female curler. She is a member of Çelebi S.K. in Erzurum. Currently, she is studying physical education and sports at the Fırat University. She is the first ever Turkish curler to skip a men's or women's team at the World Championship, competing in the 2022 World Women's Curling Championship.

Career
While simultaneously competing on the women's team, Yıldız skipped the Turkish national junior team from 2013 to 2018. Notably, she reached the final of the 2015 European Junior Curling Challenge, the final of two consecutive World Junior-B Curling Championships and skipped the Turkish team at three World Junior Curling Championships. Her team won only one game in both of their appearances in 2017 and 2018, however, secured three victories at the 2016 World Junior Curling Championships, defeating all three of Hungary, Japan and Russia.

Yıldız was admitted to the Turkish women's national team in 2012. She competed in the 2012 European Curling Championships-Group C and following her team's promotion in the European Curling Championships-Group B in Karlstad, Sweden.

Yıldız took part at the 2013 European Junior Curling Challenge-Group B in Prague, Czech Republic, which was the qualifying tournament for the 2013 World Junior Curling Championships. She skipped a 3–2 win in the round robin, failing to reach the semifinals. She ranked fifth of twelve competitors.

Yıldız competed in her first European Curling Championships in 2012 as second for the Elif Kızılkaya rink. The team finished 4–5 in the B Division, one game short of advancing to the playoff round. After losing in a tiebreaker in both 2014 and 2015, the Turkish women's team qualified for the playoffs in the B Division at the 2016 European Curling Championships, finishing second in the round robin with a 7–2 record. The team then defeated Estonia 10–2 in the semifinal before dropping the final 6–5 to Hungary. Despite the loss, the top two finish earned Turkey a spot in the A Division for the 2017 championship, the first time the country ever qualified to compete in the highest level. At the 2017 European Curling Championships, Yıldız led her Turkish squad to a 2–7 ninth-place finish, relegating Turkey back into the B Division for 2018. One of their victories, however, came against the world silver medalists team of Anna Sidorova from Russia.

Back in the B Division at the 2018 European Curling Championships, Yıldız again finished in second through the round robin with a 7–2 record. She then lost to Estonia 7–3 in the semifinal before defeating Lithuania 6–5 to earn the bronze medal. This wasn't enough, however, to advance her team into the 2019 A Division. For the first time in her career, Yıldız topped the round robin at the 2019 European Curling Championships again with a 7–2 record. This earned her team the top seed in the playoff round, where they easily defeated England 9–4 in the semifinal. This advanced her Turkish side to the final, which they would drop 5–2 to Italy's Veronica Zappone. Despite the loss, their top two finish not only earned them a berth in the A Division for 2021, but also a spot at the 2020 World Qualification Event for a chance to qualify for the 2020 World Women's Curling Championship. At the event, Yıldız led Turkey to a 4–3 round robin record, enough to earn the third playoff spot. They then faced Italy for the final berth in the World Championship. Again, however, the Italians got the best of Team Turkey, defeating them 8–4 and earning the last spot at the Women's Worlds. The Turkish team did not compete in any international events during the 2020–21 season due to the cancellation of all events because of the COVID-19 pandemic.

The 2021–22 season was a breakout season for Turkish curling, particularly Yıldız, as the nation found relative successful in the international events they attended. At the start of the season, Erzurum hosted the 2021 Pre-Olympic Qualification Event to qualify teams for the 2021 Olympic Qualification Event. In both the women's and mixed doubles disciplines, Yıldız was successful in qualifying Turkey for the Olympic Qualification Event, finishing a perfect 5–0 with partner Uğurcan Karagöz in the mixed doubles and going 5–1 to qualify her women's team. Their next event was the 2021 European Curling Championships, where Yıldız and her team competed in the A Division. Through the event, Turkey posted three victories against Denmark, Estonia and Italy, enough to finish in seventh place in the group. This seventh-place finish was enough to earn them a direct spot into the 2022 World Women's Curling Championship, the first time Turkey ever qualified for a men's or women's world championship. Next was the Olympic Qualification Event, held December 5 to 18 in Leeuwarden, Netherlands. First was the mixed doubles event, where Yıldız and her partner Uğurcan Karagöz lost all six of their matches. She then played in the women's event where she, with teammates Öznur Polat, Berfin Şengül, Ayşe Gözütok and Mihriban Polat, finished 3–5 through the round robin. Their three victories, however, came against the top three teams in the event. The team defeated the eventual Olympic gold and silver medalists Eve Muirhead and Satsuki Fujisawa, as well as the silver medalists from 2018 in Korea's Kim Eun-jung. Into the new year, Yıldız and the women's team represented Turkey at the World Championship. After losing multiple close games in extra ends, the Turkish team was able to record their first victory in World Women's Championship history against Czech Republic's Alžběta Baudyšová 7–5 in Draw 17 of the event. The team ultimately finished the event in eleventh place with a 2–10 record, recording their second victory against the Scottish team who had to withdraw before the event began.

Yıldız has competed in four World Mixed Doubles Curling Championship for Turkey from 2016 to 2019. Her best finish came in 2018 where she, along with partner Uğurcan Karagöz, finished eighth out of forty teams. Through the round robin, the pair finished with a 5–2 record. They then defeated Estonia in the round of sixteen before dropping the quarterfinal match to Canada. She has also competed in four World Mixed Curling Championship's in 2015, 2016, 2017 and 2019. Her best finish at the event came in 2017, where she threw fourth stones for the Turkish team skipped by Alican Karataş. The team, with Semiha Konuksever and Orhun Yuce on the front end, finished the round robin with a 5–1 record. This earned them a berth in the round of sixteen, where they defeated Hungary. They then were defeated by Norway, eliminating them from the event.

Personal life
Yıldız is employed as a teacher.

Achievements

References

External links

Turkish female curlers
Fırat University alumni
Living people
1996 births
Sportspeople from Erzurum
Turkish educators
21st-century Turkish women